Mikuláš Radványi (born 22 November 1968) is a Slovak football manager of Železiarne Podbrezová and former forward. He has previously managed Pohronie, Spartak Myjava, Komárno, SFM Senec and Dunajská Streda.

Club career
Radványi made eight league appearances for Opava in the Gambrinus liga.

Honours

Manager
DAC Dunajská Streda
DOXXbet liga: Winners: 2012–13 (Promoted)

References

External links
 FK DAC 1904 profile 
 

1968 births
Living people
Sportspeople from Dunajská Streda
Hungarians in Slovakia
Slovak footballers
Slovak expatriate footballers
Slovak football managers
Slovak expatriate football managers
Association football midfielders
FC DAC 1904 Dunajská Streda players
Czechoslovak First League players
FK Slovan Duslo Šaľa players
Slovak National Football League players
FC Spartak Trnava players
Slovak Super Liga players
1. FC Saarbrücken players
2. Bundesliga players
SFC Opava players
Czech First League players
SC Neusiedl 1919 players
SV Würmla players
ŠK SFM Senec managers
KFC Komárno managers
TJ OFC Gabčíkovo managers
FC DAC 1904 Dunajská Streda managers
Spartak Myjava managers
FK Pohronie managers
FK Železiarne Podbrezová managers
2. Liga (Slovakia) managers
3. Liga (Slovakia) managers
Slovak Super Liga managers
FK Frýdek-Místek managers
Czech National Football League managers
Mezőkövesdi SE managers
Nemzeti Bajnokság I managers
Expatriate footballers in Germany
Slovak expatriate sportspeople in Germany
Expatriate footballers in Austria
Expatriate football managers in Austria
Slovak expatriate sportspeople in Austria
Expatriate football managers in the Czech Republic
Slovak expatriate sportspeople in the Czech Republic
Expatriate football managers in Hungary
Slovak expatriate sportspeople in Hungary